Kevin Todd (born 28 February 1958) is an English former professional footballer who played in the Football League as a forward.

References

1958 births
Living people
English footballers
Footballers from Sunderland
Association football forwards
Newcastle United F.C. players
Darlington F.C. players
Newcastle Blue Star F.C. players
Whitley Bay F.C. players
Berwick Rangers F.C. players
Spennymoor United F.C. players
Bishop Auckland F.C. players
English Football League players
Scottish Football League players